Jen Lee may refer to:

 Jen Lee (cartoonist), cartoonist, illustrator, and author
 Jen Lee (sledge hockey), American sledge hockey player
 Jen Sookfong Lee, Chinese Canadian broadcaster and novelist

See also  
 Jennifer Lee (disambiguation)